Clypeomorus batillariaeformis, common name : the necklace or channeled cerith, is a species of sea snail, a marine gastropod mollusk in the family Cerithiidae.

Description
The shell size varies between 8 mm and 30 mm

Distribution 
The distribution of Cerithium moniliferum includes the Indo-West Pacific. along Japan, the Solomons, the Fiji Islands, Heron Island, Australia, Indonesia and the Philippines; in the Indian Ocean along Madagascar and the Mascarene Basin and in the Red Sea

Life habits 
These animals form large groups as the tide recedes. Feeding on beach rock at a specific height above average low tide level, the snails slowly move about in clusters, conserving the moisture that allows them to respire out of water.

Parasites 
Parasites of Clypeomorus batillariaeformis include Lobatostoma manteri.

References

 Dautzenberg, Ph. (1929). Mollusques testaces marins de Madagascar. Faune des Colonies Francaises, Tome III
 Drivas, J. & M. Jay (1988). Coquillages de La Réunion et de l'île Maurice

External links
 

Clypeomorus
Gastropods described in 1966